Mounam Sammadham is a 1990 Indian Tamil-language legal thriller film written by S. N. Swamy, directed by K. Madhu and produced by Kovai Chezhiyan. The film stars Mammootty (in his Tamil film debut) and Amala. It revolves around a lawyer representing a wrongfully convicted man.

The film was released on 15 June 1990. The film went on to become a commercial and critical success. This film along with Azhagan (1991), Thalapathi (1991), Kilipetchu Ketkava (1993) and Makkal Aatchi (1995) established Mammootty as a superstar in Tamil Nadu. This film was dubbed into Telugu as Lawyer The Great, released on 15 February 1991.

Plot 

The plot revolves around the wrong conviction of a business man and the efforts taken by a lawyer to find the truth.

Cast 

Mammootty as Adv. K.C. Raja M.A., B.L., Bar-at-law
Amala as Dr. Hema
Jaishankar as Sundaram
Nagesh as Paramasivam
R. Sarathkumar as Balu
Sathyapriya as Savitri
Sukumari as Sundaram's mother-in-law
Kumarimuthu as Munusamy
Srikanth as public prosecutor chandran
Y. G. Mahendran as Adv. J.Shekar
Thyagu as Gundan
Suresh Chakravarthy as Raja's friend
Charle as Mani
Jai Ganesh as Kalyanam
R. S. Shivaji as Guest House Caretaker
Sreeja as Vijayalakshmi
M. S. Thripunithura as Palghat
Prathapachandran as Sessions Court Judge Srinivasan
S. R. Veeraraghavan as Madras High Court Sr Judge
Peeli Sivam as Circle Inspector
Nagarajacholan as Muthu
T. S. Raghavendra as Makkal Kural Editor
Cochin Haneefa as Kallupatti Rangan
Appa Haja as Natarajan
Y. Vijaya as Prostitute Rani
S. K. Rajavelu as High Court Judge
Vani as Janaki

Production 
Mounam Sammadham was the first Tamil film of Malayalam actor Mammootty. It took inspiration from his own film Oru CBI Diary Kurippu.

Soundtrack 
The music was composed by Ilaiyaraaja and the lyrics were written by Pulamaipithan and Gangai Amaran. The song "Kalyaana Thaen Nilaa" is set in Darbari Kanada raga.

Telugu version

Lyrics for the dubbed Telugu version Lawyer The Great were written by Rajasri.

Reception 
N. Krishnaswamy of The Indian Express praised the film, particularly Mammootty's performance. C. R. K. of Kalki, however, was less positive, saying the film was like an ordinary novel. The film was both a critical and commercial success.

References

External links 
 

1990 films
1990s Tamil-language films
Films about capital punishment
Films directed by K. Madhu
Indian courtroom films
Indian legal films
Legal thriller films
Films scored by Ilaiyaraaja
Films about miscarriage of justice